Lieutenant-Colonel William Tonson, 1st Baron Riversdale (3 May 1724 – 4 December 1787), was an Irish landowner, soldier and politician.

Tonson was the son of Richard Tonson, for many years Member of Parliament for Baltimore, by his second wife Peniel Gates, daughter of a Colonel Gates. He was a lieutenant-colonel in the 53rd Regiment of Foot and served in the Spanish invasion of Portugal in 1762 under William, Count of Schaumburg-Lippe. In 1768 he was returned to the Irish House of Commons for Tuam, a seat he held until 1776, and then represented Rathcormack until 1783. The latter year he was raised to the Irish peerage as Baron Riversdale, of Rathcormack in the County of Cork.

Lord Riversdale married Rose Bernard, daughter of James Bernard and sister of the 1st Earl of Bandon, in 1773. They had eight sons and two daughters. He died in December 1787, aged 63, and was succeeded by his second but eldest surviving son, William. Riversdale's eighth and youngest son, Ludlow, who eventually succeeded in the barony, was Bishop of Killaloe and Clonfert.

References

1724 births
1787 deaths
Barons in the Peerage of Ireland
Peers of Ireland created by George III
Irish MPs 1761–1768
Irish MPs 1769–1776
Irish MPs 1776–1783
18th-century Irish landowners
Irish soldiers
Place of birth missing
Members of the Parliament of Ireland (pre-1801) for County Cork constituencies
Members of the Parliament of Ireland (pre-1801) for County Galway constituencies